Eastview Mall, located in Victor, New York (near Rochester, New York), is an upscale indoor shopping center owned and managed by Wilmorite Properties.

The mall is anchored by the traditional chains Von Maur, Macy's, JCPenney, and Dick's House of Sports while featuring the premier brands Abercrombie & Fitch, Anthropologie, Free People, Janie and Jack, and Madewell.
Eastview is located just off New York State Thruway (Interstate 90) Exit 45 on New York State Route 96. This  shopping center has 144 stores and services including some that are unique to the Rochester-area market. Eastview has a nationally recognized, quality restaurant selection at the front courtyard parking valet entrance.

Eastview Mall serves the entire Metro-Rochester, NY region, attracting customers from throughout Western NY. Visitors to the nearby Finger Lakes Vineyards and nearby resort lake towns also shop at Eastview Mall.

History
Eastview Mall was built in 1971. Original tenants were Sibley's and Sears. An expansion a year later added McCurdy's.
It was expanded in 1995 with the addition of a wing anchored by Lord & Taylor, and JCPenney and again at the main entrance in 2003. In November 2011, it was announced that regional chain The Bon-Ton would shutter its location. It was announced upscale chain Von Maur would build a 140,000 square foot store in its place.

In 2017, a Tesla supercharging station was added in the mall parking lot.

In August, 2018, it was announced Sears would shutter as part of an on going plan to phase out of brick-and-mortar. Plans were announced to develop Dicks House of Sports a new concept by Dick's Sporting Goods. Plans for a skating rink were later announced to be attached to the store. 

On August 27, 2020, Lord & Taylor announced they would shutter their brick-and-mortar fleet after modernizing into a digital collective department store.

Current Shopping & Entertainment
 AAO: Against All Odd
 Abercrombie & Fitch
 Abercrombie Kids
 Aerie
 Aeropostale
 Allstate Insurance
 American Eagle Outfitters
 Amita's Express Salon
 Andy's Candies
 Ann Taylor
 Anthroplogie
 Apple Store
 AT&T
 Athleta
 Banana Republic
 Banter by Piercing Pagoda
 Bath & Body Works
 Best Buy
 BoxLunch
 Brighton Collectibles
 Buckle
 Build-a-Bear Workshop
 cellAXS
 Charlotte Russe
 CinnaRoasted Nuts
 Citizens Bank
 Claire's
 Collector's Paradise
 Dick's House of Sport
 Eddie Bauer
 Elegant Store
 Ethan Allen
 Exotic Snack Factory
 Express
 Fast-Fix Jewelry Repairs
 FBN Leggings & More
 Foot Locker
 Forever 21
 Francesca's Collections
 Free People
 FYE
 GAP
 GAPBody
 GAPKids
  
Garage
 Glenna's CBD Best Oil
 Go! Calendar, Games & Toys
 Go! Calendars
 Goodwill
 Guess
 H&M
 Hannoush Jewelers
 Heroes Hideout
 Hickory Farms
 Hobby House Toys
 Hollister Co.
 Home Depot
 Hot Topic
 Icing by Claire's
 Impact Earth
 iRepair Expert
 J. Jill
 Janie and Jack
 JCPenney
 JCPenney Beauty
 JCPenney Hair Salon
 JCPenney Portraits
 JD Sports
 Journeys
 Kay Jewelers
 L.L. Bean
 L'Occitane en Provence
 Lego
 LensCrafters
 Lids
 LOFT
 Lovesac
 Lululemon
 Lush Cosmetics
 Macy's
 Macy's Backstage
 Madewell
 Mario's Hair Designers
 Massage Envy
 Michael Kors
 Nail Studio and Spa
 Oakley
 Offline by Aerie
 Old Navy
 Opinions LTD
 Oriental Rug Mart
 Pandora
 Pearle Vision
 Perfume Hot
 Pettis Pools & Patio
 PINK
 Pottery Barn
 Raymour & Flanigan
 Refreshed Shoe Cleaner
 Regal Cinemas
 S and I Signs
 Sephora
 Shoe Department
 Showcase
 Sleep Number
 Socks to Be With You
 Soft Surroundings
 Soma Intimates
 Spencer's
 Staples
 Sunglass Hut
 T-Mobile
 Target
 Teeser Custom Design & Print
 Tesla Supercharger
 The Children's Place
 The Plug
 The Source Fine Jewelers
 Things Remembered
 Tillys
 Time Out Zone
 Toothpick World (limited time)
 Torrid
 Toys R Us
 Tuxedo Junction
 Vans
 Vera Bradley
 Verizon Wireless
 Victoria's Secret
 Von Maur
 Williams-Sonoma
 Windsor
 Yankee Candle
 Zales
 Zumiez

Current Dining
 Adelita's Mexican Cocina & Tequila
 Auntie Anne's
 Burger King
 Champps
 Charleys Philly Steaks
 Famous Wok
 Hershey's Ice Cream
 Marble Slab Creamery
 Nocino Bar & Ristornate
 P.F. Chang's China Bistro
 Pepper Palace
 Pita Chik
 Purrs and Paws Cat Cafe
 Root31 Cafe & Eatery
 Shaka
 Sicilian Delight
 Subway 
 Taichi Bubble Tea
 Village Bakery & Cafe

References

Shopping malls in New York (state)
Buildings and structures in Monroe County, New York
Shopping malls established in 1971